Charles Jones Jenkins (January 6, 1805June 14, 1883) was an American politician from Georgia. A Democrat, Jenkins served as Attorney General of Georgia from 1831–1834. He then went on to serve as Governor of Georgia from December 14, 1865 to January 13, 1868. He was removed from office and replaced by Thomas H. Ruger as military governor after Jenkins refused to allow state funds to be used for a racially integrated state constitutional convention. Jenkins remained a respected figure in Georgia, and despite not running for the office, he received two electoral votes in the 1872 United States presidential election, due to the premature death of candidate Horace Greeley.

Early life
Jenkins was born in South Carolina. His family moved to Jefferson County, Georgia, and he attended the University of Georgia in Athens at a young age; his exact dates of attendance are not known. Jenkins left the university before graduating and finished his education in 1824 at Union College in Schenectady, New York. In 1831 Jenkins succeeded George W. Crawford as attorney general for the State of Georgia, himself succeeded in 1834 by Ebenezer Starnes.

Political life
Jenkins first gained widespread attention as the author of the Georgia Platform, a proclamation by a special state convention that endorsed the Compromise of 1850. In the 1852 Presidential election, he ran for Vice President under presidential candidate Daniel Webster for the "Union Party". During the American Civil War, he was appointed by Governor Joseph E. Brown as a justice of the Supreme Court of Georgia.

After a state constitutional convention in 1865 re-established Georgia's state government, he ran as the only candidate for governor. He served as the Governor of Georgia from 1865 to 1868, during Reconstruction. In 1868, he refused to allow state funds to be used for a racially integrated state constitutional convention that was supervised by the U.S. military occupation. In response, General George Meade (of the Third Military District) installed Brig. General Thomas H. Ruger as military governor and Jenkins fled the state, taking with him the state seal to thwart state fund payments which had been ordered by the United States military authority. He later returned.

In the 1872 U.S. presidential election, he received two electoral college votes. In that election, Liberal Republican candidate Horace Greeley died after the election but before the electors convened and so two electors from Georgia cast their votes for Jenkins.

In the state constitutional convention of 1877, delegates unanimously chose Jenkins as president of the convention when they assembled on July 11, 1877.

Death and legacy
Jenkins died on June 14, 1883. He was interred in Summerville Cemetery in Augusta, Georgia.

Jenkins County, Georgia is named in his honor.

See also
 List of speakers of the Georgia House of Representatives

References

External links
Jenkins at New Georgia Encyclopedia
Jenkins at OurGeorgiaHistory.com

1805 births
1883 deaths
Georgia (U.S. state) Attorneys General
Georgia (U.S. state) Constitutional Unionists
Georgia (U.S. state) lawyers
Democratic Party governors of Georgia (U.S. state)
Politicians from Augusta, Georgia
Justices of the Supreme Court of Georgia (U.S. state)
Union College (New York) alumni
Candidates in the 1872 United States presidential election
1852 United States vice-presidential candidates
University of Georgia people
Speakers of the Georgia House of Representatives
Democratic Party members of the Georgia House of Representatives
19th-century American judges
19th-century American lawyers